

The Lewis T. Gilliland House is a historic residence in Portland, Oregon, United States. An excellent 1910 example of the American Craftsman style, it was designed by prominent Portland architect Ellis F. Lawrence by closely adapting plans published by Gustav Stickley. Stickley was the leading national exponent of Craftsman architecture, and no other work by Lawrence so precisely captures Stickley's aesthetic.

The house was entered on the National Register of Historic Places in 1989.

Notes

See also
National Register of Historic Places listings in Northeast Portland, Oregon

References

External links

Oregon Historic Sites Database entry

1910 establishments in Oregon
American Craftsman architecture in Oregon
Houses completed in 1910
Houses on the National Register of Historic Places in Portland, Oregon
Irvington, Portland, Oregon
Portland Historic Landmarks